Rushmoor is a district in the English county of Hampshire.

Rushmoor may also refer to:
Rushmoor, Shropshire, England
Rushmoor, Surrey, England